Chereshovska Reka is a village in the municipality of Smolyan, located in the Smolyan Province of southern Bulgaria. As of 2007, the village had a population of 15 people.

References

Villages in Smolyan Province